Anzal District is in Urmia County, West Azerbaijan province, Iran. At the 2006 National Census, its population was 25,252 in 5,923 households. The following census in 2011 counted 25,729 people in 6,744 households. At the latest census in 2016, the district had 25,599 inhabitants in 6,825 households.

References 

Urmia County

Districts of West Azerbaijan Province

Populated places in West Azerbaijan Province

Populated places in Urmia County